St Michael's is a mixed-use redevelopment project in Jackson's Row in Manchester city centre, England, by Gary Neville's development company. It is to include two towers containing a hotel, flats, offices, a rooftop restaurant and a public square. First proposed in 2016, it began construction in 2022.

Development
St Michael's Manchester is a redevelopment project by Gary Neville's company Relentless on the site of the former Bootle Street police station, Manchester Reform Synagogue and Sir Ralph Abercromby pub on Jackson's Row, Manchester, planned to consist of two towers, 9 and 40 storeys high, with a 191-room hotel, 181 flats, a rooftop restaurant seating 900, 185,000 sq ft of office space, and a public park, St Michael's Square.

History
The development was proposed in 2016, originally by Neville in partnership with Ryan Giggs, after almost ten years of land acquisition and planning, and was to have had 21-storey and 31-storey black-clad towers designed by architecture firm Make. There were objections to the size and design of the towers, the loss of historic buildings, and the lack of affordable housing. After a redesign, with Make leaving the project and being replaced by Hodder + Partners, retention of the pub and police station façades, and expansion of the planned retail component, it was approved by Manchester City Council in March 2018. Giggs resigned from the venture in 2020, and the conversion of the police station into a second, 29-room hotel was replaced with office conversion in 2021 because of economic contraction in the wake of the COVID pandemic.

Phase One
Construction of Phase One, the nine-storey office block with rooftop restaurant and St Michael's Square, was begun by Bowmer + Kirkland in January 2022, and is scheduled for completion in 2024. Relentless is developing this phase in partnership with the American investment company KKR.

Phase Two
Phase Two is to be a 40-storey building containing the hotel and apartments, developed by Relentless with Salboy Group. Domis is to begin construction in January 2023 for scheduled completion in 2026.

References

Proposed buildings and structures in Manchester